Ann Kok (born 11 January 1973) is a Singaporean actress. She started her acting career in 1993 after emerging as a finalist in the local talent-search competition Star Search, where she won a contract to work on Chinese-language TV channel SBC 8 (now MediaCorp Channel 8). 

Subsequently, Kok rose to popularity and played numerous lead roles in television series in the 1990s. She was ranked the "Third Ah Jie" by the local media, which defined her as the third most prominent actress in Singapore's Chinese-language entertainment industry of that time. In 2000, Kok ventured overseas to expand her acting career. She returned to Singapore and joined the now-defunct MediaWorks in 2003 and later MediaCorp in 2005.

Early life
Kok is the youngest child of a family of six children. She has two sisters and three brothers.

Career
For the first time in her 13-year-long career, Kok was nominated for the Best Actress Award in the Star Awards 2006 for her performance as Jiang Ruqing in Love Concierge. In La Femme, she played a career-minded woman who neglects her family and later suffers from breast cancer. In 2009, she played the lead role Alice Zeng, a materialistic and show-off housewife, in the highly acclaimed drama series Housewives' Holiday, which won her praise and positive reviews from audiences. For her performance, Kok was nominated for the Best Actress Award again in the Star Awards 2010 and was the hot favourite, but missed the award.

In 2011, Kok made another appearance in Kampong Ties, which was filmed in Sungai Lembing, Malaysia, for a period of 4 months. In the same year, Kok also appeared in The Oath and Bountiful Blessings, starring alongside established actors such as Christopher Lee, Tay Ping Hui and Hong Kong actress Jessica Hsuan.

Apart from acting, Kok has released three solo albums. She also sang at The Peranakan Ball in 2009 for The Little Nyonya musical.

In 2012, Kok became the first actress in Asia to snag two nominations in the same category since the inception of the Asian Television Awards (ATA) in 1994. Kok was nominated for the Best Actress in a Leading Role award for her performances in Kampong Ties and Show Hand for ATA 2012. Results would be announced in December 2012.

In 2013, Kok won Top 10 Most Popular Female Artistes in Star Awards 2013. She also walked away with "BottomSlim Sexiest Legs" Award for Star Awards 2012 Walk of Fame. At the Star Awards 2013, Kok was nominated in Favourite Female Character, Favourite On-screen Couple (Drama), BottomSlim Sexiest Legs Award, Top 10 Most Popular Female Artistes.

In March 2014, Kok left Mediacorp. As she chose not to renew her contract, she was deemed ineligible to participate in Star Awards in that year. Her last television series before her contract ended was In the Name of Love. In the same year, she appeared on the big screen with her debut appearance in local film, The Filial Party.

In 2015, after almost a year's break from acting, she acted as Deng Xue Li in Crescendo, produced by Wawa Pictures.

In April 2016, she played the lead role in Toggle.sg original 4-episode psychological thriller mini-series Trapped Minds.
In the same year, she did a musical as Hua Mulan's elder sister, Hua Mulian. The original comedy with a twist Mulan The Musical took place in Resort World Sentosa theatre from 16 December 2016 to 5 February 2017, with the famous troop from Taiwan. They broke record by performing 36 shows in 2 months in Singapore.

Filmography

Film

Television

Discography

Studio albums

Theatre

Awards and nominations

References

External links
Official website
Ann Kok at Facebook
Ann Kok at Instagram

Singaporean film actresses
Singaporean television actresses
Singaporean television personalities
Singaporean people of Cantonese descent
20th-century Singaporean actresses
21st-century Singaporean actresses
Living people
1973 births